The timeline shows changes, both personal or title, of the head of state and the head of government of the Republic of Chile from 18 September 1810 until today, regardless of whether president, vice-president, supreme director, interim or junta.

19th century

20th century

21st century

Notable
 Presidents died before the end of term:
Federico Errázuriz Echaurren, Pedro Montt, Elías Fernández, Pedro Aguirre Cerda, Juan Antonio Ríos, Salvador Allende
 Presidents democratically elected then resigned or overthrown:
José Manuel Balmaceda, Arturo Alessandri, Emiliano Figueroa, Carlos Ibáñez del Campo, Salvador Allende
 the shortest and longest terms:
Pedro Opazo (1 day) and Augusto Pinochet (17 years)
 Most non-consecutive periods:
Arturo Alessandri (three times, although his second term is seen as termination of the first term)

See also
 President of Chile
 List of presidents of Chile

Notes

Timeline
Government of Chile
Politics of Chile
Modern history of Chile
Chile history-related lists